Cernat is a commune in Covasna County, Transylvania, Romania composed of three villages:
Albiș / Kézdialbis
Cernat / Csernáton
Icafalău / Ikafalva

It formed part of Háromszék district of the Székely Land region in historical Transylvania. Cernat village was formed with the merger of two villages, Cernatu de Jos (Alsócsernáton) and Cernatu de Sus (Felsőcsernáton).

Demographics

The commune has an absolute Székely Hungarian majority. According to the 2011 Census it has a population of 3,956 of which 98.51% or 3,897 are Székely Hungarians.

References

Communes in Covasna County
Localities in Transylvania